Action Painting is a 2017 compilation album by the British band The Creation. The compilation was the first time the complete studio recordings of the band were released. They were remastered from the original tapes by the group's original producer Shel Talmy as well as being given stereo mixes where previously unavailable.

Release
Action Painting was released on March 17, 2017 by The Numero Group.

Reception

Peter Margasak of The Chicago Reader commented that the compilation showcased "convincing evidence that the band possessed at least minor genius" Stephen Thomas Erlewine gave the album a Best New Reissue statement in Pitchfork Media, comparing the band to other contemporaries of the era, summarizing that the  "compilation overwhelmingly proves, they were as self-aware as the Move, as vicious as The Who, and as clever as The Kinks." AllMusic declared the reissue " the best-looking and best-sounding set yet." for the band and declared the group's music as living "on as some of the most exciting, most impressive sounds of the '60s."

Track listing
Disc 1

Disc 2

References

2017 compilation albums
The Creation compilation albums
The Numero Group compilation albums